Ganye is a town and Local Government Area of Adamawa State, Nigeria. Jada and Toungo Local Governments were carved out from Ganye local government area of Adamawa state Nigeria. Ganye is bordered by Jada Local Government Area to the North and East, Toungo Local Government Area to the South and Taraba State to the West. It is the headquarter of the Sama (Chamba) people worldwide.

History 
Ganye Local Government Area is one of the major Local Government Areas of Adamawa State with Mubi and Numan.
The major and ruling tribe of Ganye is the Sama (Chamba) Language with other tribes such as Fulani and Mummuye and others.

The Ruler 
The Paramount ruler of Ganye is a First Class traditional ruler: Alh.Umaru Adamu Sanda OON (Gangwari Ganye II).

Major Villages 
Major villages in Ganye include Sugu, Gurum and Jaggu.

Demography 

The soil of Ganye is the loamy type which makes it the hub of agriculture and earned it the title of 'the food basket of the state'. The Local Government Area experience two seasons of Rains and dryness. Rainy season begins in Ganye as early as March and terminates in October. Ganye Local Government Area is drained by River Dadonu which takes it source from the Jangani mountains.

Local Government Areas in Adamawa State